Celos is a 1946 Argentine drama film directed by Mario Soffici and starring Pedro López Lagar and Zully Moreno.  It won four Silver Condor awards, including Best Film, Best Director (Mario Soffici),  Best Actor  (Pedro López Lagar) and  Best Original Screenplay   (Tulio Demicheli), given by the Argentine Film Critics Association in 1947 for the best films and performances of the previous year.

Cast
Pedro López Lagar as Pablo
Zully Moreno as Luisa
Juan José Míguez as Roberto
Ricardo Galache 
Federico Mansilla as lawyer
Gloria Bayardo as Luisa's mother
Carlos Belluci  as José
Adela Adamowa as Selva
Amadora Gerbolés
Salvador Sinaí

References

External links
 

1946 films
1940s Spanish-language films
1946 romantic drama films
Argentine romantic drama films
Films based on The Kreutzer Sonata
Argentine black-and-white films
Films with screenplays by Tulio Demicheli
1940s Argentine films